The Greatest Hits is Lil Suzy's final physical release to date. It was released in 2002. Her biggest single hits along with some other tracks from her albums are compiled on this collection. The songs all were re-recorded and differ more or less slightly from the originals.

The album includes three new tracks, "Sweet Lies", "So Lonely", and "Back in Your Arms".

In 2004, the album was released in Canada by the label SPG Music and in 2007 the album was re-released under the name of Lil Suzy: Hits Anthology by record company Essential Media Group.

Track listing

 "Take Me in Your Arms" (3:52)
 "Promise Me" (3:55)
 "Just Can't Get over You" (4:36)
 "Now and Forever" (3:42)
 "When I Fall in Love" (3:56)
 "Memories" (3:54)
 "Love Can't Wait" (4:02)
 "Real Love" (3:38)
 "Can't Get You Out of My Mind" (3:36)
 "Sweet September Love" (3:59)
 "Turn the Beat Around" (3:55)
 "Paradise" (4:20)
 "You're the Only One" (4:06)
 "I Still Love You" (4:10)
 "Every Time I Dream" (4:38)
 "Sweet Lies" (3:40)
 "So Lonely" (3:53)
 "Back in Your Arms" (3:33)

References

Lil Suzy albums
2002 greatest hits albums